Sheléa Frazier also known as Sheléa, stylized as SHELÉA or sheléa, is an American singer, songwriter, and pianist. Her 2014 track "I'll Never Let You Go" peaked at 23 on Billboard's Adult R&B chart. She is mentored by Stevie Wonder, and is a protégée of Quincy Jones. Sheléa portrays gospel singer Dorinda Clark Cole in the 2020 Lifetime biopic, The Clark Sisters: First Ladies of Gospel.

Life and career 
Sheléa Frazier was born in Redwood City, California and raised in Bakersfield, California. She has been singing and playing piano since she was a child. She has cited Natalie Cole's album Unforgettable...with Love as the impetus for her desire to become a singer.

Sheléa co-wrote and performed the theme song to the UPN television sitcom All of Us from 2003 to 2006.

Sheléa began her professional career working with producers Jimmy Jam and Terry Lewis. In 2008, she sang lead on the track "Someone to Watch Over Me", at the request of Take 6; the song was nominated for a Grammy. Afterward, Stevie Wonder contacted the singer for collaborations.

Sheléa first gained wider prominence in 2012 after she posted a YouTube video singing a medley of Whitney Houston covers after the singer's death, which went viral. Later that year, she was invited to the White House to sing for the Obamas at the Gershwin Prize presentation. The next year, Sheléa performed a Whitney Houston tribute at the Grammy Museum.

Shelea's debut album, Love Fell On Me, was released in 2013. The track "I'll Never Let You Go" song peaked at 23 on Billboard's Adult R&B chart. She also wrote and performed the 2011 track "Love Fell On Me" for the film Jumping the Broom.

In 2019, she released an album Pretty World. A Tribute to Allen & Marilyn Bergman, which included Stevie Wonder and Kirk Whalum. Later that year, Quincy Jones produced a concert special on PBS featuring the singer, called Quincy Jones Presents: Sheléa. Shelea's performance featured David Foster.

She starred in the 2020 Clark Sisters biopic The Clark Sisters: First Ladies of Gospel as Dorinda Clark-Cole.

Mentorship and influences 
Sheléa is mentored by Stevie Wonder and is a protégée of Quincy Jones. She was a backup singer for Wonder's Songs in the Key of Life Tour in 2014 and 2015. In 2018, she held a two-month residency at Jones' Q's Bar & Lounge in Dubai.

She has stated that Whitney Houston is one of her biggest inspirations.

Discography

Albums
2013: Love Fell on Me
2015: You
2019: Pretty World. A Tribute to Allen & Marilyn Bergman
2022: Love Fell On Me (Remastered)

Extended plays
2019: Don't Wanna Wait 'Til Christmas

Soundtracks
2020: The First Ladies of Gospel: The Clark Sisters Biopic Soundtrack

Singles
2012: Seeing You
2012: Don't Want To Wait 'Til Christmas
2013: Love the Way You Love Me
2013: I'm Sure It's You (The Wedding Song)
2013: America the Beautiful
2014: I'll Never Let You Go
2015: What Are You Doing the Rest of Your Life
2018: Moonlight (featuring Kirk Whalum)
2018: Pretty World (featuring Stevie Wonder)
2019: City of Angels
2019: Don't Wanna Wait 'Til Christmas
2020: You Are Enough
2020: We the People
2020: Mary Did You Know
2020: Silent Night
2021: Grace
2022: Final Say

Album appearances

References

External links
Official website
 AllMusic biography

20th-century African-American women singers
21st-century African-American musicians
21st-century African-American women
21st-century American pianists
21st-century American women pianists
African-American jazz musicians
African-American pianists
American gospel singers
American jazz singers
American keyboardists
American performers of Christian music
American rhythm and blues musicians
American women singers
Living people
Place of birth missing (living people)
1980 births